Piotroniowice  is a village in the administrative district of Gmina Wołów, within Wołów County, Lower Silesian Voivodeship, in south-western Poland. The earliest mention concerning Piotroniowice dates from 13th century. It was burned by the Hussites in 1431. It was also damaged during the Thirty Years' War several times. Piotroniowice in 1939 had a population of 250. Prior to 1945 it was in Germany.

The village has a population of 161.

References

Piotroniowice